Aston Manor was a constituency of the House of Commons of the Parliament of the United Kingdom. It existed from 1885 until 1918, and elected one Member of Parliament (MP) by the first-past-the-post system of election.

Boundaries
1885–1918: The local government district of Aston Manor.

The constituency was created, as a borough constituency in Warwickshire, for the 1885 general election. In 1885 the area was to the north of the Birmingham parliamentary borough. Birmingham, which from 1889 was a county borough with city status, gradually expanded into adjacent areas.

The constituency bordered to the west Handsworth; to the north and east Tamworth and to the south Birmingham East and Birmingham North.

By 1918 the Aston area had been incorporated within the growing city of Birmingham. For the 1918 general election, the Aston Manor constituency was abolished, and parts of its territory were incorporated in a new borough constituency known as Birmingham Aston. The new seat comprised parts of the then County Borough of Birmingham wards of All Saints, Aston, Lozells and St. Mary's. The seat was smaller and more the northern part of central Birmingham than Aston Manor had been.

Members of Parliament

Elections

Elections in the 1880s

Elections in the 1890s

Elections in the 1900s

Elections in the 1910s

See also
Aston Manor
List of former United Kingdom Parliament constituencies

References

F W S Craig, British Parliamentary Election Results 1885-1918; Macmillan, 1974
Vincent and Stenton (eds.), McCalmont’s Parliamentary Poll Book of Election Results 1832-1918; Harvester Press, 1971

Parliamentary constituencies in Warwickshire (historic)
Parliamentary constituencies in Birmingham, West Midlands (historic)
Constituencies of the Parliament of the United Kingdom established in 1885
Constituencies of the Parliament of the United Kingdom disestablished in 1918